Larissa Petrosyan (born 5 April 1993), known professionally as Lara Yan, is a Georgian beauty pageant titleholder and model.

Personal life
Petrosyan was born in Telavi, Georgia and is an Armenian-Georgian. She is signed to IC Model Management in Tbilisi. In December 2017, she placed as the first runner-up in Miss Georgia 2017, and represented Georgia in Miss Universe 2018.

References

External links
MISS GEORGIA - IC MODEL MANAGEMENT
The Miss Universe - The Greatest Celebration of Women
Lara Yan

1993 births
Beauty pageant winners from Georgia (country)
Female models from Georgia (country)
Georgian people of Armenian descent
Living people
Miss Universe 2018 contestants
People from Telavi